Simplício Rodrigues de Sá (São Nicolau Tolentino, Cape Verde, — 9 March 1839, Rio de Janeiro) was a Portuguese-born painter and art professor who spent most of his career in Brazil.

Biography
Simplício Rodrigues de Sá was born in the parish of São Nicolau Tolentino (now part of the municipality of São Domingos) just north of the city of Praia in the island of Santiago

He studied in Lisbon and emigrated to Rio de Janeiro in Brazil in 1809. Seven years later, he became a follower of Jean Baptiste Debret, joining his group, the French Artistic Mission and helping to lay the foundations for what would become the Academia Imperial de Belas Artes in 1826.

He was also named a court painter and a private art tutor to Princess Maria da Glória, the future Queen of Portugal. For his services, Emperor Pedro I awarded him the Order of Christ in 1826, and named him a Knight in the Order of the Southern Cross. In 1831, when Debret returned to Paris, De Sá took his place as head of the History Painting Department at the Imperial Academy. 

In 1833, he became drawing master for the child-Emperor Pedro II and his sisters. He also organized the first two major public exhibitions held there, in 1829 and 1830, although his first solo exhibition appears to have been given posthumously.

He worked in several genres, including religious works for the Church of the "Ordem Terceira de São Francisco da Penitência", but is largely remembered as a portrait painter who focused on members of the Royal Family. He was apparently blind at the time of his death.

References

External links

1780s births
1839 deaths
Brazilian painters
Portrait painters
Migrants from Portugal to Portuguese Brazil
Court painters
People from Santiago, Cape Verde